Mikhail Maksimovich Pryakin (Russian: Михаил Максимович Пряхин, born October 3, 1935) was a former Soviet Nordic combined skier. He competed most notably at the 1960 Winter Olympics in Sqaw Valley, California where he finished in 12th place.

Pryakin won two national titles in the Nordic combined, and was a member of the Soviet national team in 1957–1965. In retirement he worked as a skiing coach in Moscow.

Notable competitions

1960 Winter Olympics  – Nordic combined – 12th place
1964 Winter Olympics   – Nordic combined –  DNS

References

1935 births
Living people
Soviet male Nordic combined skiers
Olympic Nordic combined skiers of the Soviet Union
Nordic combined skiers at the 1960 Winter Olympics
Sportspeople from Tambov